Princess Caraboo is a 1994 American historical comedy-drama film.  It was directed by Michael Austin, and written by Austin and John Wells.  The story is based on the real-life 19th-century character Princess Caraboo, who passed herself off in British society as an exotic princess who spoke a strange foreign language.  It stars Phoebe Cates.

Plot
In Regency England, an exotically dressed woman is found in the fields, speaking a language no-one can understand. She ends up at the home of the Worrall family, the local gentry.

Their Greek butler, Frixos, thinks the woman is a fraud from the start. Mr. Worrall sends her to the magistrate to be tried for vagrancy, but Mrs. Worrall agrees to care for her.  Mr. Gutch, a local printer and newspaper reporter, takes an interest in the case, especially after the woman claims via mime to be  Princess Caraboo.

Gutch talks to the farm workers who found her and learns she had a book from the Magdalene Hospital in London on her. When the Worralls leave on a trip the servants inspect her for a tattoo, which they believe all natives of the South Seas have and are shocked to find Princess Caraboo has one on her thigh.

Frixos tells Gutch he now thinks Princess Caraboo's a genuine princess. Mr Worrall uses her presence to recruit investors for the spice trade which will be facilitated by her when she returns to her native land. Gutch brings in Professor Wilkinson, a linguist who is initially dismissive of Caraboo's story but has enough doubt to refuse to say she is a fraud.

The local society finds Princess Caraboo fascinating, and they flock to attend parties and soirees with her. Mr. Gutch begins investigating people connected with the Magdalene House. Lady Apthorpe takes Caraboo to a ball held for the Prince Regent, who is fascinated by her.

Gutch learns Caraboo is actually Mary Baker, who worked as a servant for Mrs. Peake. He sneaks into the ball to warn her she's been found out, but she refuses to acknowledge what he tells her. Mrs. Peake comes and confronts Caraboo and identifies her as Mary Baker. She is locked up.

The local magistrate and Mr. Worrall want to hang her. Mrs. Worrall gives Mr. Gutch documents implicating her husband and the magistrate in a bank fraud. He uses these to work a trade, he will bury the story if Mary Baker can go to America. Gutch, who has fallen in love with Mary, leaves with her for the United States.

Cast

 Phoebe Cates as Princess Caraboo
 Jim Broadbent as Mr. Worrall
 Wendy Hughes as Mrs. Worrall
 Kevin Kline as Frixos
 John Lithgow as Professor Wilkinson
 Stephen Rea as Gutch
 Peter Eyre as Lord Apthorpe
 Jacqueline Pearce as Lady Apthorpe
 John Wells as Reverend Wells
 John Lynch as Amon McCarthy
 John Sessions as Prince Regent
 Arkie Whiteley as Betty
 Jerry Hall as Lady Motley
 Anna Chancellor as Mrs. Peake

Reception
Princess Caraboo received mixed reviews.

References

External links

 
 
 
 

1990s romantic comedy-drama films
1994 comedy films
1994 drama films
1994 films
American romantic comedy-drama films
Beacon Pictures films
Biographical films about fraudsters
British romantic comedy-drama films
Cultural depictions of George IV
Fictional-language films
Films set in Bristol
Films set in England
Films set in the 1810s
Films shot in England
Films shot in Wales
TriStar Pictures films
1990s English-language films
1990s American films
1990s British films